Jesse Stringer (born 3 April 1991) is a former professional Australian rules football player who played for  in the Australian Football League (AFL). He was recruited with pick number 61 in the 2010 Rookie Draft having played for the Port Adelaide Football Club in the SANFL. He made his debut in round 4, 2012, against .

On 20 June 2012, Stringer was banned from 2012 AFL season due to unacceptable behaviour involving a woman. Victoria Police said police arrived at a street in Grovedale, where they received a report about an alleged assault. He was arrested and released pending further inquiries.

Stringer was delisted at the conclusion of the 2014 AFL season.

References

External links

1991 births
Living people
Geelong Football Club players
Australian rules footballers from South Australia
Port Adelaide Magpies players